Damir Milinović (born 15 October 1972) is a Croatian professional football manager and former player. He was named manager of Dubrava in June 2022.

Club career
Born in Rijeka, Milinović spent most of his career in his local club, Rijeka, before moving to Croatia Zagreb in 1997. He failed to impress in Croatia so he returned to Rijeka in the next season. After an impressive season with Rijeka, during which the club lost the title in last match, Milinović left for Germany in summer of 2000, signing with VfL Bochum. As Bochum finished last in the Bundesliga and were relegated, Milinović returned to Rijeka after only one season. He spent half a season in Rijeka before joining eventual season champions NK Zagreb. In January 2003, Milinović returned to Rijeka for the third and final time, spending there one and a half season before joining Dinamo Zagreb once again. He left Dinamo after only half a season, joining Austria Salzburg just few months before club was rebranded as Red Bull Salzburg. Milinović returned to Croatia after only half a season in Austria, signing for second division side Pomorac Kostrena. After two seasons with Pomorac, Milinović announced his retirement in summer of 2007.

International career
Milinović made his debut for Croatia in a June 1997 Kirin Cup match against Turkey, coming on as a 85th-minute substitute for Tomislav Erceg, and earned a total of 4 caps, scoring no goals. His final international was an April 1999 friendly match against Italy.

Managerial career
A few months after he announced his retirement, Milinović was appointed as a manager of his last club, Pomorac Kostrena. In Pomorac he was quite successful, finishing amongst top clubs in second division and reaching quarterfinals of Croatian Cup. He left Pomorac in 2010 and took over third division side NK Grobničan. With Milinović in charge, Grobničan went from mediocre third division club to one of the best clubs in the league. They were on the edge of promotion to second division two years in a row but were financially incapable to take that step. 

In May 2012, Milinović was appointed head coach of HNK Gorica. Milinović spent only six months in Gorica; he resigned in November 2012 after disappointing results in the first half of the season. In January 2013, Milinović took over third division side Novigrad. He signed for Gorica again, on 9 September 2015, but got sacked on 30 March 2017. In August 2017, Milinović became manager of Slovenian club FC Koper.

On 28 August 2020, Milinović was appointed to be second division side Orijent 1919 head coach.

Career statistics

Club

International

Managerial statistics

Honours

Player
NK Zagreb
Croatian First League: 2001–02

References

External links
 
 

1972 births
Living people
Footballers from Rijeka
Association football defenders
Croatian footballers
Croatia international footballers
HNK Orijent players
HNK Rijeka players
GNK Dinamo Zagreb players
VfL Bochum players
NK Zagreb players
FC Red Bull Salzburg players
NK Pomorac 1921 players
First Football League (Croatia) players
Croatian Football League players
Bundesliga players
Austrian Football Bundesliga players
Croatian expatriate footballers
Expatriate footballers in Germany
Croatian expatriate sportspeople in Germany
Expatriate footballers in Austria
Croatian expatriate sportspeople in Austria
Croatian football managers
HNK Gorica managers
HNK Cibalia managers
FC Koper managers
HNK Orijent managers
Croatian expatriate football managers
Expatriate football managers in Slovenia
Croatian expatriate sportspeople in Slovenia